The political union of Samoa (an independent state previously known as Western Samoa) and American Samoa (a US territory also known as Eastern Samoa), both of which are part of the Samoan Islands, has been proposed ever since their current status was established in the first half of the 20th century under the Tripartite Convention, and even earlier: In 1919, Western Samoa expressed a desire to unite with American Samoa. The Samoan people in both Western Samoa and American Samoa share ethnicity and culture, but their islands have remained politically separated. The western islands were incorporated as the Western Samoa Trust Territory under British administration from 1920–1946, and under New Zealand administration from 1946 to 1962. The Inter-Samoan Consultative Committee was established in 1955 to promote cooperation between the two. Richard Barrett Lowe, the governor of American Samoa from 1953 to 1956, said during his tenure that it had been decided that reunification with Western Samoa was not to be discussed by the Committee. In 1969, a political commission in American Samoa rejected a proposal for unification with Western Samoa.

Sentiments for and against unification exist in varying degrees. Nevertheless, some Western Samoan political leaders have argued in favor either of unification or of making Western Samoa an American Trust Territory. Although inhabitants of American Samoa have a strong Samoan national identity, there is no large movement among them in favor of independence or unification with Western Samoa. American Samoa protested Western Samoa's official name change to "Samoa" in 1997, concerned that it would imply that Western Samoan has authority over all the Samoan islands, including the eastern Samoan islands that are part of American Samoa.

See also
 Samoan crisis of the 1880s
 Unification of Saint Martin

References

Sources

External links

Politics of Samoa
Politics of American Samoa
National unifications
Samoan Islands
Proposed political unions